Near-net-shape is an industrial manufacturing technique. As the name implies, the initial production of the item is very close to the final, or net, shape. This reduces the need for surface finishing. By minimizing the use of finishing methods like machining or grinding, near-net-shape production eliminates more than two-thirds of the production costs in some industries.

Processes
The following are various near-net-shape processes categorized by material.

Ceramics
Gelcasting
Ceramic injection molding
Spray forming
Structural ceramic production

Composites
Lanxide process

Plastics
Injection moulding
Rapid prototyping

Metals
Casting
Permanent mold casting
Powder metallurgy
Linear friction welding
Friction welding
Metal injection molding
Rapid prototyping
Spray forming
Superplastic forming
Cold forming
Semi-solid metal casting
Photochemical machining

Metalworking terminology
Plastics industry